Typhoon Sally, known in the Philippines as Typhoon Maring was an intense tropical cyclone that caused widespread damage across southeastern Asia, particularly in China, in September 1996. Forming well east of the Philippines on September 5, Sally quickly intensified as it tracked westward within favorable conditions. The system reached tropical storm intensity several hours after tropical cyclogenesis was completed, and strengthened further into typhoon intensity the following day. Quickly moving across the South China Sea, Sally substantially weakened but remained a strong typhoon before making its first landfall on the Leizhou Peninsula on September 9. The tropical cyclone's trek brought it briefly over the Gulf of Tonkin before making a final landfall near the border of China and Vietnam. The typhoon rapidly deteriorated inland and dissipated later that day.

Meteorological history

In early September 1996, the monsoonal wind flow pattern shifted to a zone extending from the Philippines to Micronesia, in contrast to an anomalous pattern the month prior. On September 2, an area of deep atmospheric convection within this zone began to consolidate into a tropical disturbance near Guam. At this time, the Joint Typhoon Warning Center (JTWC) began to monitor the system. Tracking northwestward, the disturbance steadily organized. Early on September 4, analysis showed that the system had developed a well-defined low-level circulation center. The rate of intensification quickened during the day, and at 1800 UTC the depression intensified into tropical storm strength, earning it the name Sally.

Tracking north-northwestward, Sally attained typhoon intensity by 0600 UTC on September 6. At the time, the typhoon had a minimum barometric pressure of 990 mbar (hPa; 29.24 inHg) according to the Japan Meteorological Agency (JMA). Rapid intensification followed shortly afterwards, with the typhoon reaching the equivalent of Category 3 intensity by 0600 UTC on September 7. Ten hours later, the JTWC upgraded Sally to super typhoon status. The following morning, Sally accelerated into the South China Sea under the influence of a strong subtropical ridge to the north. Despite its movement over waters, the typhoon steadily weakened as it tracked westward. The typhoon briefly tracked over the Gulf of Tonkin before making a second and final landfall just north of the border between China and Vietnam. Upon moving inland, Sally quickly weakened before dissipating over southwestern China on September 9.

Preparations and impact

As Typhoon Sally approached Hong Kong on September 8, precautionary measures were initiated in the then-British colony. Ferry service to Hong Kong's outlying islands were suspended, while active fishing vessels sought shelter in the local harbor. As the typhoon strengthened and rapidly approached the Chinese coast, the HKO issued the Strong Wind Signal No. 3 that evening. As such, warnings were raised to the Southeast Gale or Storm Signal No. 8. The signal warning continued to be held for just over 3 hours, the shortest period of time for which that warning was held since Tropical Storm Wynne in 1984. As effects from Sally subsided, the warning signals were downgraded until all warnings were discontinued shortly before noon on September 9. Though the warnings for Hong Kong were lifted early, schools in the colony were suspended throughout September 9.

As the typhoon approached the Chinese coast, two men became stranded on a cliff in Sok Kwu Wan as a result of the storm. Though they required aerial rescue via helicopter, both men only sustained minor injuries. Passing south of Hong Kong throughout September 8–9, Sally remained sufficiently south of the province to not cause considerable damage. However, trees, scaffolding, and signboards were toppled by strong winds. Precipitation remained light, though some localized flooding events were reported. Two people were killed – one in Luk Chau village and another in Ma On Shan. In nearby Macau, trees were also uprooted, and low-lying areas were inundated by flooding conditions exacerbated by the high tides caused by Sally.

Overall in China, the effects of Sally were catastrophic, particularly in the provinces of Hainan, Guangdong and Guangxi. There, at least 140 people were known to have been killed by the typhoon, with an addition 130 unaccounted for and another 2,000 injured. An estimated 300,000 homes collapsed and 500,000 hectares (1.24 million acres) of farmland were damaged. Offshore, 60 vessels capsized in high winds. Overall economic losses from Sally were estimated at over ¥12 billion (US$1.5 billion), the largest loss for the region since 1954.

See also

Typhoon Hagupit
Typhoon Koryn

Notes

References

External links
JMA General Information of Typhoon Sally (9616) from Digital Typhoon
JMA Best Track Data (Graphics) of Typhoon Sally (9616)
JMA Best Track Data (Text)
JTWC Best Track Data of Super Typhoon 23W (Sally)

1996 Pacific typhoon season
1996 disasters in the Philippines
Typhoons in the Philippines
Typhoons in China
Typhoons in Vietnam
1996 disasters in China
1996 in Vietnam
Typhoons
1996 disasters in Vietnam